Rafik Amrane (born 25 April 1977) is an Algerian rower. He competed in the men's single sculls event at the 2000 Summer Olympics.

References

External links
 

1977 births
Living people
Algerian male rowers
Olympic rowers of Algeria
Rowers at the 2000 Summer Olympics
Sportspeople from Algiers
21st-century Algerian people